Wola Mała  is a village in the administrative district of Gmina Łańcut, within Łańcut County, Podkarpacie Voivodeship, in eastern Poland.

The village has a population of 162.

References

Villages in Biłgoraj County